Dvornik or Dvorník is a surname. Notable people with the name include:

Boris Dvornik (1939–2008), Croatian actor
Dino Dvornik (1964–2008), Croatian singer, songwriter, music producer and  actor
Francis Dvornik (1893–1975), Czech priest and academic
Igor Dvornik (1923–2010), Croatian radiation chemist
Josef Dvorník (born 1978),  Czech football player